George Henry Soule Jr. (June 11, 1887 – April 14, 1970) was a labor economist, author, and a long time editor and contributor to The New Republic.

Background
George Soule was born in Stamford, Connecticut on June 11, 1887 and was graduated from Yale University in 1908.

Career

He was a member of the editorial staff of The New Republic from 1914 to 1918 and during 1919 editorial writer for the New York Evening Post.

In 1920, Soule helped organize the Labor Bureau, Inc. (LBI), an independent professional group, with Evans Clark, Alfred L. Bernheim, David J. Saposs.  The LBI acted as economic advisers and public relations counselors for labor unions.

Soule drafted a report on the labour policy of the Industrial Service Sections Ordnance Department and Air Service for the War Department and was commissioned a Second Lieutenant in the Coast Artillery Corps. He was a director of the Labour Bureau, Inc., which engages in economic research for labour organizations.

He wrote the 1946 review of Animal Farm in The New Republic.

Personal and death

In 1940 he was married to Helen Flanders Dunbar. A daughter, Marcia, was born in 1942.

Works
 The New Unionism in the Clothing Industry with J.M. Budish, 1920
 The Intellectual and the Labor Movement, 1923
 The Coming American Revolution, 1934
 A Planned Society, 1935
 The Future of Liberty, 1936
 Ideas of the Great Economists, 1952
 Ideas of the Great Economist, 1958
 The New Science of Economics, 1964
 Planning U.S.A., 1967

References

1887 births
1970 deaths
Labor economists
20th-century American writers
American non-fiction writers
20th-century American newspaper editors
The New Republic people
Writers from Stamford, Connecticut
Yale University alumni